Bindeshwari Goyal (born 1 June 1979) is an Indian former cricketer who played as a right-arm off break bowler. She appeared in three Test matches and four One Day Internationals for India in 2002 and 2003. She played domestic cricket for Madhya Pradesh.

References

External links
 
 

1979 births
Living people
Cricketers from Indore
Indian women cricketers
India women Test cricketers
India women One Day International cricketers
Madhya Pradesh women cricketers
Central Zone women cricketers
21st-century Indian women
21st-century Indian people